Events in the year 1859 in Chile.

Incumbents
President: Manuel Montt

Events
January 5–21 - Revolution of 1859
March 14 - Revolution of 1859: Battle of Los Loros
April 12 - Revolution of 1859: Battle of Maipon
April 29 - Revolution of 1859: Battle of Cerro Grande

Births

Deaths

 
Years of the 19th century in Chile
Chile